Pavel Malíř (born 8 April 1975 in Bohumín, Czech Republic) is a former Czech footballer who mostly played for FK Fotbal Třinec in Czech 2. Liga as a right sided midfielder.

He spent the early years of his career at his local club FC Karviná. He also played in the German Regional divisions with FC Hennigsdorf before moving to FK Fotbal Třinec who at the time played in Moravian–Silesian Football League, 3rd tier of Czech football. Malíř has gone on to make 350 appearances for the club, where he serves as a key player in the squad.

References

Czech footballers
1979 births
Living people
MFK Karviná players
FK Fotbal Třinec players
Association football midfielders
Czech National Football League players